Gabbard is a surname. Notable people with the surname include:

Doug Gabbard, II, American judge
Kason Gabbard (born 1982), baseball pitcher
Mike Gabbard (born 1948), Hawaiian politician
Glen Gabbard (born 1950), American psychiatrist
Steve Gabbard (born 1966), American football player
Tulsi Gabbard (born 1981), American politician
Jason Gabbard (born 1976), American entrepreneur

See also 
 Gabbert